Dongotono (Dongotono pronunciation: /dóŋòtónò/) is an Eastern Nilotic language spoken by an estimated 5,000 people in South Sudan.

Classification 
Dongotono has been classified as a member of the Eastern Nilotic branch of Nilotic, in the Eastern Sudanic sub-grouping of Nilo-Saharan. Within Eastern Nilotic, Dongotono is considered part of the Lotuko language group, in the Lotuko-Maa branch of Teso-Lotuko-Maa (also referred to as the non-Bari languages). Other members of the Lotuko language group include Lopit, Lotuko, Lokoya and Lango, all spoken in nearby regions of in South Sudan. Of these languages, Lopit is most similar to Dongotono, with a comparative study showing 66.4% lexical similarity between the two. The same study showed 60.6% lexical similarity between Dongotono and Lotuko, and 56.5% similarity between Dongotono and Lokoya.

Geographic distribution 
The Dongotono language is spoken by the Dongotono people, who live on the north-western slopes of the Dongotono Mountains in the southern part of Eastern Equatoria State, South Sudan. Administratively, this area is part of Ikotos County, and the Dongotono live in large and densely populated settlements which include Chakari, Ikotos, Isoke and Chorokol,. There are an estimated 5,000 speakers of the language, and the language is considered threatened,  though the number of Dongotono people may be as much as 35,000.

Phonology 

There has been very little research on Dongotono, but some tentative phonological and morphological observations can be found in Vossen (1982), based on wordlist data collected in the 1970s. Vossen notes that the data are too limited to draw any safe conclusions. He observed that the phoneme inventories of Dongotono, Lokoya and Lopit were similar enough to be treated together, and provided a consonant inventory for all three languages together, represented in the table below.

Consonants 

The voiced palatal stop /ɟ/ is described as implosive (/ʄ/). Vossen also notes that /b/ is interchangeable with implosive [ɓ], and /d/ is interchangeable with implosive [ɗ]. /p/ does not occur word-initially in Vossen's Dongotono data, and is replaced by [f] or [ɸ] between vowels. /pː/ does not seem to be present in Dongotono. /k/ is replaced by [x] in certain environments but is retained in others. There are no examples the voiced velar stop /g/ in Vossen's Dongotono data. The glottal stop /ʔ/ occurs word-finally only. The glides /wː/ and /jː/ are only found word-medially.

Vowels 

According to Vossen, Dongotono has two sets of five vowels, distinguished by the phonological feature Advanced Tongue Root ([ATR]). These are listed in the table below.

However, Vossen notes that no different symbols were used for [+ATR] /a/ and [-ATR] /a/ "as they cannot be distinguished phonetically".

Vossen finds no examples of vowel length being contrastive in Dongotono. He observes that vowel harmony plays an important role, but does not describe the process.

Tone 

Vossen observes that on the surface there are four tones in Dongotono: High, Low, Mid, and High-Falling. They appear to be used for both lexical and grammatical contrasts.

Grammar 
Word order in Dongotono is generally Verb-Subject-Object, as is typical for most Eastern Nilotic languages.

Vossen states that for all the non-Bari languages, including Dongotono, the verbs fall into two morphological classes, conventionally called Class 1 and Class 2. Class 2 verbs have a stem with an initial close-front vowel /i-/ or /ɪ-/, and Class 1 verb stems are consonant-initial. A number of possible verbal affixes were observed but their functions not determined.

Number-marking on nouns appears to be extremely irregular. A variety of suffixes are used to indicate singular, singulative, and plural.

Like other languages in the Lotuko group, Dongotono has two grammatical genders, masculine and feminine.

Vocabulary 

Some example Dongotono words are given below, from the wordlist in Vossen (1982). Each Dongotono word is in the phonetic transcription used by Vossen, as there is not yet an established orthography for the language.

References 

Eastern Nilotic languages
Languages of South Sudan